The Sagebrush Trail is a 1922 American silent Western film directed by Robert Thornby and starring Roy Stewart, Marjorie Daw and Wallace Beery.

Cast
 Roy Stewart as Sheriff Larry Reid
 Marjorie Daw as Mary Gray
 Johnnie Walker as Neil, Mary's brother
 Wallace Beery as José Fagaro

References

Bibliography
 Connelly, Robert B. The Silents: Silent Feature Films, 1910-36, Volume 40, Issue 2. December Press, 1998.
 Munden, Kenneth White. The American Film Institute Catalog of Motion Pictures Produced in the United States, Part 1. University of California Press, 1997.

External links
 

1922 films
1922 Western (genre) films
1920s English-language films
American silent feature films
Silent American Western (genre) films
Films directed by Robert Thornby
American black-and-white films
1920s American films